Sinatra Reprise: The Very Good Years is a single disc compilation taken from the four disc box set The Reprise Collection, a 1990 box set by the American singer Frank Sinatra. For many years, this was the only collection of Sinatra's Reprise work on one disc until 2008's collection Nothing But The Best. The Very Good Years reached #98 on the Billboard Top 200 album charts in 1991.

Track listing
"The Last Dance" (Sammy Cahn, Jimmy Van Heusen) - 2:46
"Night and Day" (Cole Porter) – 3:37
"I Get a Kick Out of You" (Porter) – 3:14
"Luck Be a Lady" (Frank Loesser) - 5:14
"The Way You Look Tonight" (Jerome Kern, Dorothy Fields) - 3:22
"My Kind of Town" (Cahn, Van Heusen) - 3:08
"The Best Is Yet to Come" (Cy Coleman, Carolyn Leigh) - 2:54
"Fly Me To The Moon" (Bart Howard) - 2:49
"It Was a Very Good Year" (Ervin Drake) - 4:27
"Love and Marriage" (Cahn, Van Heusen) - 2:12
"I've Got You Under My Skin"  (Porter) – 3:43 
Recorded live at the Sands Hotel, 1966
"Strangers in the Night" (Bert Kaempfert, Charles Singleton, Eddie Snyder)  – 2:25
"Summer Wind" (Heinz Meyer, Hans Bradtke, Johnny Mercer)  – 2:53
"All or Nothing at All" (Arthur Altman, Jack Lawrence) – 3:57
"That's Life" (Kelly Gordon, Dean Kay)  – 3:10
"My Way" (Paul Anka, Claude François, Jacques Revaux, Gilles Thibault)  – 4:35
"The Lady Is a Tramp" (Rodgers, Hart) - 2:56 
live performance at Madison Square Garden, New York City, New York, October 13, 1974
"Send in the Clowns" (Stephen Sondheim) - 3:36
"Nancy (With the Laughing Face)" (Phil Silvers, Van Heusen) - 2:28
"Theme from New York, New York" (Fred Ebb, John Kander) - 3:26

Personnel
 Frank Sinatra - vocals
 Nelson Riddle - arranger, conductor
 Don Costa
 Gordon Jenkins
 Billy May
 Ernie Freeman
 Quincy Jones
 Neal Hefti
 Bill Miller - pianist, conductor
 Count Basie and his Orchestra
 Woody Herman and his Orchestra

References

1991 compilation albums
Frank Sinatra compilation albums
Reprise Records compilation albums